Tomás Barris Ballestín (born 1 February 1930) is a Spanish former middle distance runner who competed in the 1960 Summer Olympics.

References

1930 births
Living people
Spanish male middle-distance runners
Olympic athletes of Spain
Athletes (track and field) at the 1960 Summer Olympics
Mediterranean Games gold medalists for Spain
Mediterranean Games medalists in athletics
Athletes (track and field) at the 1959 Mediterranean Games
20th-century Spanish people